Iferni (Tarifit: Ifaani, ⵉⴼⴻⵔⵏⵉ; Arabic: إفرني) is a commune in Driouch Province of the Oriental administrative region of Morocco. At the time of the 2004 census, the commune had a total population of 7527 people living in 1356 households.

Towns and villages

References

Populated places in Driouch Province
Rural communes of Oriental (Morocco)